Jayati Bhatia  (born July 28, 1970) is an Indian actress. She is best known for her role as Nirmala "Mataji" Bharadwaj in Sasural Simar Ka (2011–18), one of the most longest-running TV shows that aired on Colors TV. Currently she's essaying the role of Geetanjali Devi Oswal in Sasural Simar Ka Season - 2.

Personal life
Originally a Bengali, Bhatia was born in Orissa, India but moved to Delhi when she was a month old. As a child, she was trained in classical Odissi but has admitted that she finds western dance forms difficult.

Bhatia met her husband Kiran Bhatia, during her first play and was encouraged by him to be more active on the theatre circuit. In April 2017, on her way to the sets of Sasural Simar Ka, Kiran was involved in an argument after which he was beaten up. Bhatia has expressed that she was supported by her mother-in-law and owes much of her success to her.

Bhatia is a supporter of LGBT rights.

Career

Television debut and initial days (1996–2007)

Bhatia debuted into Hindi television industry in 1995 with Challenge as Khushnuma. In the sitcom Tu Tu Main Main on Star Plus, she essayed Kumud. For the first of many collaborations, she teamed up with producer Ekta Kapoor in Kanyadaan and had a small role in her production Itihaas.

Bhatia began the next century and decade as the wife of Arun Govil's character in Kaise Kahoon on Zee TV. Her next three projects were produced by Kapoor; the first being comedy-drama Kitne Kool Hai Hum. The second one was Sony TV's Kutumb where she played the male lead's aunt Kavita Mittal. In their third consecutive collaboration, she portrayed Geetu Basu in the cult classic daily soap Kasautii Zindagii Kay from 2003 to 2006 for continuously three years.

In 2003, Bhatia was also seen as the titular lead's friend Bindiya in Jassi Jaissi Koi Nahin on Sony TV. In 2005, she was roped in as Titli in Sinndoor Tere Naam Ka on Zee TV. In Zee TV's another venture Mamta, she was cast as Mishti from 2006 to 2007.

Film debut, Saas v/s Bahu and Kitchen Champion (2007–2011)

By foraying into Bollywood, Bhatia begun her film career with the Sridhar Rangayan-directed drama 68 Pages where she starred as commercial sex worker Payal. It premiered worldwide at the International Film Festival of Kerala and was screened at several international film festivals. For returning to television, she reunited with Kapoor to play Pammi Godbole in Sony TV's rom-com Kuchh Is Tara from 2007 to 2008. For the first time in her career, she signed as a contestant in Sahara One's dance television series Saas v/s Bahu and survived till the finale before winning it.

In 2009, Bhatia enacted the role of Gursheel Malhotra in Star Plus's Sabki Laadli Bebo. Her second film, Raja Krishna Menon's black comedy Barah Aana, released that year. From 2010 to 2011 she portrayed Manju, a loud neighbour in Star Plus's Sasural Genda Phool. Her first project of 2011 turned out as a contestant in the fourth season of cooking based reality show Kitchen Champion hosted by Ronit Roy and Smita Singh; she was declared as winner of the show in finale and thus won a show for the second time, after Saas v/s Bahu.

Sasural Simar Ka and beyond (2011–present)

In April 2011, Bhatia achieved the biggest (in terms of success) and immensely praised opportunity of her career in Colors TV's soap opera Sasural Simar Ka where she acted as Nirmala Devi Bhardwaj aka Mataji, the matriarch of the male lead's family. The show became one of the most highest-rated television shows on TRP charts and made its position among the most longest-running Indian television series, before ending in March 2018 post a successful run of seven years continuously.

Simultaneously along with Sasural Simar Ka shoot, she participated in the fifth season of reality show Jhalak Dikhhla Jaa in June 2012 but was eliminated from it the very next month. That year she voiced for actress Ileana D'Cruz's character in Anurag Basu's comedy-drama Barfi! which was a major financial hit with global earnings of over 175 crores. Her next simultaneous appearances with Sasural Simar Ka shoot were in Ananth Narayan Mahadevan's feature film Rough Book and the reality comedy series Comedy Nights Bachao. In 2017, she was seen in the film The Wishing Tree.

Right after the end of Sasural Simar Ka in March 2018, Bhatia joined Star Plus's Naamkarann as antagonist Kamini Kapoor. The show culminated two months later, in May 2018. In August 2018, she began playing another antagonistic part of Roopa Mittal in Colors TV's Internet Wala Love until its wrap up in March 2019. By venturing into OTT, she made her digital debut in 2019 with the horror-comedy Bhoot Purva which streamed on OTT platform ZEE5.

In 2020, Bhatia's first web series project Tansener Tanpura premiered on OTT platform Hoichoi. From August 2020 to January 2021 she worked as Nutan Jaiswal in Star Plus's rom-com Lockdown Ki Love Story. In the second season of web series Girls Hostel that streamed digitally on OTT platform SonyLIV, she starred as a dean.

Bhatia is currently reprising her role as Gitanjali Devi Oswal, a new character, in the second season of Sasural Simar Ka entitled Sasural Simar Ka 2, which premiered on Colors TV and Voot on 26 April 2021.

Filmography

Television

Films

Web series

Plays
 Going Solo Part 1
 Mahatma Vs Gandhi
 Mad About Money
 Acid
 Khatijabai of Karmali Terrace
 The Vagina Monologues
 Amavas ke Amaltas
 Salaam, Noni Apa

References

External links
 

Living people
Indian soap opera actresses
1970 births